Hope For The Day (HFTD) is a Chicago-based non-profit organization that focuses on suicide prevention by providing outreach and mental health education through the use of music and art. The organization uses concerts, workshops, and events, and innovative partnerships to provide outreach and education.

History 
Hope For The Day was founded in 2011 by Jonny Boucher after losing sixteen people to suicide, including his boss and mentor, Mike Scanland, in 2010. Boucher began working in the music industry at an early age as a concert promoter, and initially promoted HFTD by passing out fliers with information on mental health resources at music venues, churches, libraries, and schools. The organization also uses speaking engagements at local Chicago venues to raise awareness. HFTD has partnered with bands and organizations such as Beartooth, Neck Deep, and Havas.

Hope for the Day's approach to suicide prevention is motivated by the fact that suicide prevention nationwide and across the world lack a unified framework for guiding action. This Action Plan for decreasing suicide rates has 3 complementary, interlocking components:

1. Outreach: Starting the Conversation. Starting the Conversation through Outreach: Peervention starts with a conversation by meeting people where they’re at, not where we expect them to be, and raising the visibility of community mental health resources.

2. Education: Advancing the Conversation. This involves ensuring that individuals, institutions, and communities are educated on proper mental health care, and how to respond to mental health challenges.

3. Take Action: Empowering the Conversation. Empowers community members to be organizers who build opportunities and promote mental health in their own networks.

Sip of Hope 
Hope For the Day established Sip of Hope, a coffee bar in Chicago's Logan Square neighborhood in the winter of 2016. Boucher partnered with Jesse Diaz, founder of Dark Matter Coffee, a Chicago based coffee brewing company. Sip of Hope opened on May 3, 2018. Senator Dick Durbin and others attended to give their support for Hope for the Day's mission. The coffee shop donates all of their profits to suicide prevention projects, mental health education, and serve as outreach. Sip of Hope staff are trained and certified in mental health first aid to assist customers who seek information about mental health challenges. The staff provides aid through conversation and resources about mental wellness.

Partnerships

Dark Matter Coffee
Hope for the Day has partnered with Chicago's Dark Matter Coffee for years, with this alliance crystallizing in 2017 when they decided to launch a social enterprise coffee shop together to be named Sip of Hope (SOH), which they opened in May 2018.

Mastodon
In 2017, the friendship between Mastodon's Brann Dailor (drums/vocals) and Jonny Boucher resulted in the band performing at Chicago's The Metro in honor of Brann's sister, Skye, and in support of HFTD's suicide prevention programming. Mastodon played their highly acclaimed 2009 album, Crack the Skye, in its entirety. The album pays homage to Skye, who died by suicide at the age of 14.

Beartooth 
On December 13, 2016, the American post-hardcore band Beartooth created a charity auction in support of HFTD.

Neck Deep 
Ben Barlow, lead vocalist of Welsh pop punk band Neck Deep, was interviewed by Boucher at Vans Warped Tour in 2017. He spoke about Neck Deep sharing similar goals with HFTD.

Vans Warped Tour
Johnny Boucher toured with the Vans Warped Tour. The tour had a tent at each venue where they distributed resources and acted as a place for people to seek help. Boucher went on stage and let people know that it is "OK Not To Be OK".

Chicago Digital 
Chicago Digital, a digital marketing and web design company, worked with Hope for the Day to create a website that promotes the organization to a wider audience. The website was made to update news to HFTD staff and included a custom web app to help users find outreach programs near them.

Havas Chicago 
In September 2018, advertising company Havas Chicago created a public art display to support Hope for The Day. The art installation featured 121 mannequins dressed in shirts that read the slogan "It's OK Not To Be OK". The mannequins symbolized the average suicide deaths per day of 121 suicides. The display also acted as a fundraiser known as #121ToNone, where a mannequin would be removed for every $121 dollars donated or whenever 121,000 times the hashtag #121ToNone was shared on Instagram. The display was located at Havas Chicago's lobby at 36 E. Grand Ave in downtown Chicago.

Nickel A Day Films 
HFTD teamed up with AnnMarie Parker of Nickel A Day Films to direct and create a short film based in the Chicago suburb of Naperville. The film entitled I'm Fine is about a group of friends coping after a young teenage girl commits suicide. The film revolves around the pressures on being successful and meeting the expectations of families, schools, and friends in Naperville and DuPage County.

Hope Foods 
In May 2020, HFTD also "took over" the hummus and dip company Hope Foods as part of a fundraising campaign.

Education

PEERvention Workshops 
Starting in 2016, HFTD holds free monthly health seminars at the Logan Square Public Library to educate the public on mental health and suicide prevention. The workshop supplies tools to enable proactive mental health care to individuals and communities in Chicago.

References

External links 
 

Mental health organizations in Illinois
Non-profit organizations based in Chicago
2011 establishments in Illinois